Dato' Sheikh Hussain Yee or Hussein Yee (born 1950), is a Malaysian Islamic preacher and an International Da'i of Islam as well as the President of Pertubuhan Al-Khaadem in Malaysia.

Background

Early years
Born into a Buddhist Malaysian Chinese family, Hussain Yee converted to Islam at the age of 18. Yee studied under the scholar Muhammad Nasiruddin al-Albani.

Positions held
Hussain Yee is the Founder and President of Al-Khaadem.

Among other positions, he spent a year in 1980 as an Advisor for the Cambodian Islamic Refugee Organisation in Paris, France. He has also served as a Counsellor  at PERKIM Kuala Lumpur and as the Director of Da’wah for the Islamic Center in Hong Kong from 1984 to 1985.

Controversy and response
In 2015, he gave a keynote address at the Australian Islamic Peace Conference (AIPC), which was attended by religious leaders from Jewish and Christian faiths.

Yee has said that Muslims terrorists were not responsible for the September 11 attacks on the United States, just based on "suspicion".

Hussain Ye later responded to the accusations and denied ever saying that "Jews were behind 9/11 attack", and accused The Australian newspaper of "inept journalism".

See also
List of converts to Islam
Islamic schools and branches

References

Link 
 Al-Khadeem Malaysia 

1950 births
Living people
Islamic University of Madinah alumni
Malaysian Muslims
Converts to Islam from Buddhism
Sunni clerics
Malaysian imams
21st-century imams
Former Buddhists
21st-century Muslims